China Wu Yi Co., Ltd. is a construction and engineering company that carries out international projects as the overseas arm of the Fujian Construction Engineering Group Company.  It reported $334 million in international project work in 2012, placing the company among the 250 largest international contractors as ranked by Engineering News-Record.

Projects
A 2013 report noted it had 18 projects in Kenya. The Kenyan operations of the company is one of the six largest Chinese construction companies in Kenya, competing in a highly competitive market with each other and local and European construction companies. 

One of the key projects Wu Yi was selected, in September 2006, for is the $37.2 million first phase of the $1.23 billion modernization of the Jomo Kenyatta International Airport, funded by a syndicate of Kenyan banks and the World Bank.  The company is a contractor in paving the first phase of a road between the border Kenya-Ethiopia border town of Moyale and Isiolo, a northern Kenyan gateway city in a project worth $63.9 million, funded by the African Development Bank.  A Reuters article documenting the project noted there was a pan-African significance to the project as it would lay down tarmac on one of the last unpaved sections of the Cairo – Cape Town Highway.

In another important project, it was one of several Chinese contractors that built the Thika superhighway, a project that involved widening an existing road that had one lane on one side and two lanes on the other to 12 lanes total.  The $360 million project financed by the Export-Import Bank of China was finished in 2012 on schedule.

A scholarly article in 2008 on Kenyan and Chinese economic relations, published by the Center for Strategic and International Studies, praised the work of the company in Kenya.

References

Construction and civil engineering companies of China
Companies based in Fuzhou